Eucalyptus thamnoides, also known as brown mallee, is a species of mallee that is endemic to south western Western Australia. It has smooth bark, lance-shaped adult leaves, flower buds in groups of seven, cream-coloured to pale yellow flowers and cup-shaped, conical or bell-shaped fruit.

Description
It has smooth, pale grey bark. Flowering occurs from March to July or November and the flowers are cream-coloured to pale yellow.

Taxonomy and naming
Eucalyptus thamnoides was first formally described in 2002 by Ian Brooker and Stephen Hopper in the journal Nuytsia from specimens collected by Brooker near Needilup in 1988. The specific epithet (thamnoides) is derived from the ancient Greek word thamnos meaning "a bush or shrub" with the ending -oides meaning "like", referring to the habit of this species, in contrast to that of E. astringens.

In the same edition of Nuytsia, Brooker and Hooper described two subspecies, and the names have been accepted by the Australian Plant Census:

Distribution and habitat
Subspecies megista grows on plains and low rises but not on breakaways and occurs between Quairading, the Stirling Range, Cranbrook and Hopetoun. Subspecies thamnoides grows on plains, breakaways, low stony hills and near rivers from near Gnowangerup to the Stirling Range National Park and Jerramungup.

Conservation status
Eucalyptus thamnoides and both subspecies are listed as "not threatened" by the Western Australian Government Department of Parks and Wildlife.

See also
List of Eucalyptus species

References

Eucalypts of Western Australia
thamnoides
Myrtales of Australia
Plants described in 2002
Taxa named by Ian Brooker
Taxa named by Stephen Hopper